Gračanica may refer to:

Places

Bosnia and Herzegovina
Gračanica, Bosnia and Herzegovina, a town and municipality in Tuzla
Gračanica (Bugojno), a village in Central Bosnia
Gračanica, Gacko, a village in Republika Srpska
Gračanica, Prozor, a village in Central Bosnia
Gračanica, Trnovo, a village in Republika Srpska
Gračanica, Živinice, a village in Tuzla municipality

Kosovo
Gračanica, Kosovo, a town and municipality

Montenegro
Gračanica, Montenegro, a village in Montenegro

Serbia
Gračanica, Ljubovija, a village in western Serbia
Gračanica (Prijepolje), a village in southwest Serbia

Churches
Gračanica Monastery, a 14th-century monastery in Kosovo
Hercegovačka Gračanica, a copy in Trebinje, Bosnia and Herzegovina
New Gračanica Monastery, a copy in Third Lake, United States
Valjevska Gračanica, a church in Tubravić, Serbia

Other uses
Gračanica Lake, a reservoir in Kosovo
Gračanica river or Gračanka, a river in Kosovo
Battle of Gračanica or Battle of Tripolje, in Kosovo, 1402
Eparchy of Gračanica or Eparchy of Lipljan, a former Eastern Orthodox eparchy in Kosovo 
Radio Gračanica, a Bosnian local public radio station